Celenza sul Trigno is a comune and town in the province of Chieti in the Abruzzo region of southern Italy.

References

External links

 Celenza sul Trigno Civil Records

Cities and towns in Abruzzo